Kurt Lewin founded the National Training Laboratories Institute for Applied Behavioral Science, known as  the NTL Institute, an American non-profit behavioral psychology center, in 1947. NTL became a major influence in modern corporate training programs, and in particular developed the T-groups methodology that remains in place today. Lewin died early on in the project, which was continued by co-founders Ron Lippitt, Lee Bradford, and Ken Benne, among others. The NTL Institute produced or influenced other notable and influential contributors to the human relations movement in post-World War II management though, notably Douglas McGregor (who, like Lewin, also died young), Chris Argyris, Edgar H. Schein, and Warren Bennis.

NTL began publishing The Journal of Applied Behavioral Science in 1965 and it remains a renowned publication contributing a body of knowledge to the field that increases understanding of change processes and outcomes.

The NTL Institute continues to work in the field of organization development.  The original center in Bethel, Maine continues to operate, but the organization has moved its headquarters to Silver Spring, Maryland.

See also 
 Tavistock Institute
 Sensitivity training
 Learning pyramid

References

External links 
Official NTL website

Psychology organizations based in the United States
Education in Maine
Education in Virginia
Education in Maryland
Bethel, Maine
1947 establishments in Maine